Kuramoto Station is the name of two train stations in Japan:

 Kuramoto Station (Nagano) (倉本駅)
 Kuramoto Station (Tokushima) (蔵本駅)